The Eastern Zone was one of the three regional zones of the 1964 Davis Cup.

10 teams entered the Eastern Zone, with the winner going on to compete in the Inter-Zonal Zone against the winners of the America Zone and Europe Zone. With the increase in entries, the Eastern Zone was split into two sub-zones, with the winner of each sub-zone playing to determine which team moved to the Inter-Zonal Zone.

The Philippines defeated Japan in the Zone A final, and India defeated South Vietnam in the Zone B final. In the Inter-Zonal final the Philippines defeated India and progressed to the Inter-Zonal Zone.

Zone A

Draw

Semifinals

Philippines vs. South Korea

Final

Philippines vs. Japan

Zone B

Draw

Quarterfinals

India vs. Ceylon

Malaysia vs. South Vietnam

Semifinals

Pakistan vs. India

Iran vs. South Vietnam

Final

South Vietnam vs. India

Eastern Inter-Zonal Final

Philippines vs. India

References

External links
Davis Cup official website

Davis Cup Asia/Oceania Zone
Eastern Zone
Davis Cup